Dmitri Olegovich Mironov (born December 25, 1965) is a Russian former professional ice hockey defenseman.  He was drafted in the eighth round, 160th overall, by the Toronto Maple Leafs in the 1991 NHL Entry Draft. He was part of the 1998 Stanley Cup winning Detroit Red Wings.

Playing career
Mironov played in the Soviet Union for seven seasons before moving to the National Hockey League to play for the Maple Leafs.  He debuted in Toronto in the 1991–92 season and played there for four seasons.  After a brief stint with the Pittsburgh Penguins, Mironov joined the Mighty Ducks of Anaheim.  With the Mighty Ducks in the 1997–98 season, Mironov earned a trip to the NHL All-Star Game.  Before the season was out, however, Anaheim traded him to the Detroit Red Wings for Jamie Pushor and a draft pick. He won the Stanley Cup with Detroit that season.

Mironov joined the Washington Capitals for the 1998–99 season, and played the final three seasons of his career in Washington.  In his NHL career, he appeared in 556 games and tallied 260 points.

Mironov won a gold medal at the 1992 Winter Olympics with the Unified Team, and a silver medal at the 1998 Winter Olympics with the Russian team.

Dmitri has a younger brother, Boris Mironov, who also played in the NHL.

Dmitri's son (Egor) is attending Niagara University, whom he plays hockey for. His daughter (Nicole) is a keen volleyball player.

All-Star Game appearances
 1997–1998 season (reserve)

Career statistics

Regular season and playoffs

International

External links

1965 births
Detroit Red Wings players
HC CSKA Moscow players
Houston Aeros (1994–2013) players
Ice hockey players at the 1992 Winter Olympics
Ice hockey players at the 1998 Winter Olympics
Krylya Sovetov Moscow players
Living people
Mighty Ducks of Anaheim players
National Hockey League All-Stars
Olympic gold medalists for the Unified Team
Olympic ice hockey players of Russia
Olympic ice hockey players of the Unified Team
Olympic silver medalists for Russia
Ice hockey people from Moscow
Pittsburgh Penguins players
Russian ice hockey defencemen
Soviet ice hockey defencemen
Stanley Cup champions
Toronto Maple Leafs draft picks
Toronto Maple Leafs players
Washington Capitals players
Olympic medalists in ice hockey
Medalists at the 1998 Winter Olympics
Medalists at the 1992 Winter Olympics